The 2012–13 Phoenix Suns season was the organization's 45th season in the National Basketball Association. This season was the first since the 2004–05 season that the Suns were without star point guard and former two-time MVP Steve Nash after Nash was sign-and-traded to the rival Los Angeles Lakers. Another fan favorite, Grant Hill, also left for Los Angeles in this season, but he would sign with the Los Angeles Clippers. By technicality, the player who held the most playing experience for the Suns this season was Jermaine O'Neal.

Key dates
June 28, 2012: The 2012 NBA draft took place at the Prudential Center in Newark, New Jersey.
July 1, 2012: The NBA free agency has begun.
July 4, 2012: The Suns do a sign-and-trade with the Los Angeles Lakers to exchange star point guard Steve Nash for two first round Lakers draft picks in 2013 (from the Miami Heat via the L.A. Lakers) and 2018 (due to 2015 having Top–5 protection and both 2016 & 2017 having Top-3 protection), as well as two second round picks in 2013 (from the Denver Nuggets via the L.A. Lakers) and 2014 (which eventually got traded to the Minnesota Timberwolves); Phoenix also signed forward Michael Beasley and re-signed their former back-up point guard Goran Dragić.
July 11, 2012: Teams can officially sign, trade, and even amnesty players to their liking.
July 15, 2012: The Suns used their amnesty clause on Josh Childress; Phoenix also officially sign former Houston Rockets players Goran Dragić & Luis Scola.
July 20, 2012: The Suns officially sign Michael Beasley and re-sign Shannon Brown.
July 24, 2012: The Suns sign Summer League standout P. J. Tucker.
July 27, 2012: The Suns agree to a three-way trade with the New Orleans Hornets and the Minnesota Timberwolves. The Suns would send Robin Lopez and Hakim Warrick to the New Orleans Hornets and the Lakers' 2014 second round pick to the Minnesota Timberwolves, and they receive the contracts of Brad Miller and Jerome Dyson from the Hornets, as well as Wesley Johnson and a protected future first round draft pick from the Timberwolves.
August 15, 2012: The Suns officially sign Jermaine O'Neal for one year, as well as waive the contracts of both Jerome Dyson & Brad Miller; Miller would officially retire a few weeks later.
September 20, 2012: Channing Frye was confirmed to miss all of this season due to an enlargened heart via dilated cardiomyopathy.
October 31, 2012: The regular season for the Suns begins.
January 18, 2013: Coach Alvin Gentry ended up resigning from head coaching duties.
January 20, 2013: Lindsey Hunter is announced as the new interim head coach for the Suns; assistant coach Sean Rooks resigns from his coaching duties.
January 21, 2013: Assistant head coach and Suns fan favorite Dan Majerle resigns from his assistant head coaching duties; Phoenix Mercury head coach Corey Gaines becomes assistant head coach for the rest of the season.
January 23, 2013: Defensive assistant head coach Elston Turner resigns from his assistant head coaching duties; former Phoenix Suns scout and Shanghai Sharks head coach Dan Panaggio becomes assistant head coach for the rest of the season.
February 20, 2013: The Suns trade their own 2013 second round pick to the Houston Rockets in exchange for Marcus Morris, the twin brother of Suns power forward Markieff Morris. Phoenix also waives forward-center Luke Zeller.
February 21, 2013: The Suns trade Sebastian Telfair to the Toronto Raptors in exchange for Hamed Haddadi and a 2014 second round pick (worst selection between the Raptors and the Sacramento Kings).

Offseason

NBA Draft

The Suns will once again only have pick 13 as their only first-round draft pick. The Suns used their only pick to select point guard Kendall Marshall from North Carolina. Marshall was a prolific passer, averaging 8.1 points and 9.8 assists in his last season with the Tar Heels. He also set the ACC & University of North Carolina season assist records, as well as winning the Bob Cousy Award for his performance in his sophomore year. Unfortunately, Marshall would retire from the league after playing for five years in the league. As for their second-round pick, it was traded to the Atlanta Hawks for Josh Childress via sign and trade. That selection became Mike Scott, who eventually came to Phoenix himself for a couple of days in 2017

Free agency

Veteran players Grant Hill and Steve Nash, as well as the newly signed Shannon Brown, Michael Redd, and Ronnie Price have all become unrestricted free agents as of the end of the 2011–12 NBA season. Center Robin Lopez has become a restricted free agent as of the end of the season as well. In a unique situation, former CBA player Aaron Brooks is still a restricted free agent, but due to his signing with the Guangdong Southern Tigers and the Suns not re-signing Brooks to a new contract during the 2011–12 NBA season, he'll be a restricted free agent with restricted benefits. For example, the Suns can match any offer that they see fit, but they cannot do any sign-and-trades whatsoever with him. However, Phoenix was unlikely to bring back Aaron Brooks to an restricted free agent offer, so they made him unrestricted after trying to get Eric Gordon. In addition, the Suns may also use their amnesty clause to get rid of a player that they see is holding them back. However, they have to use it a week after the July moratorium (July 11); otherwise, the amnesty clause stays with the team until at least next season.

On July 3, 2012, Eric Gordon agreed to a tentative deal with the Suns for 4 years and $58 million. However, despite Gordon saying that "Phoenix is where my heart is now", since Gordon's a restricted free agent, his offer was matched by the New Orleans Hornets a full three days after signing free agents officially took place. Phoenix has, however, gained both former back-up point guard Goran Dragić and forward Michael Beasley as of July 4, 2012. As for Steve Nash, he was officially traded to the rival Los Angeles Lakers in exchange for first and second round draft picks in the 2013 draft, as well as a first round pick in the 2015 draft and a second round pick in the 2014 draft on July 4 as well. Grant Hill also went to Los Angeles, but he went to play for the Los Angeles Clippers on July 18, 2012. Ronnie Price would sign with the Portland Trail Blazers on July 18 as well; however, unlike Grant Hill, Ronnie Price would be waived by Portland on February 21, 2013. Aaron Brooks would go to the Sacramento Kings on July 16, 2012, but he would play for them until March 1, 2013. Four days later, Brooks decided to officially sign with his former team, the Houston Rockets, which tended to reverse Phoenix and Houston's trade in 2011 that had Goran Dragić going to Houston and Brooks going to Phoenix. The last player that became a free agent, Michael Redd, ended up retiring in November 2013.

On July 15, 2012, a day after Eric Gordon's contract was matched by the Hornets, the Suns ended up placing a winning bid on former Houston Rockets power forward Luis Scola, as well as used their amnesty clause on Josh Childress, who would eventually sign with the Brooklyn Nets until December 29, 2012. On July 25, 2012, the Suns agreed to re-sign Shannon Brown, as well as sign former Texas University standout P. J. Tucker and produce a three-way trade with the New Orleans Hornets and the Minnesota Timberwolves. Two days later, the Suns exchanged Robin Lopez and Hakim Warrick to the Hornets and the Lakers' 2014 second round pick to the Timberwolves for Brad Miller's expiring contract and Jerome Dyson's non-guaranteed contract from the Hornets, as well as Wesley Johnson and a lottery protected 2013 first round draft pick that will stay in the first round until 2016 from the Timberwolves, which would then turn into two second round picks in 2016 and 2017. On August 15, 2012, the Suns decided to waive Jerome Dyson and Brad Miller's contracts and sign a one-year deal for Jermaine O'Neal. Former Suns player Leandro Barbosa considered playing for the Suns again, as well as the Los Angeles Lakers and the Brooklyn Nets, before officially signing with the Boston Celtics on October 17, 2012. Luke Zeller and Diante Garrett were initially announced as training camp invitees on October 1. However, due to the heart condition involving Channing Frye, both players ended up making the team. Other players announced as possible candidates that day include Othyus Jeffers, Solomon Jones, and Ike Diogu.

Coaching changes
Before the 2011–12 NBA season officially ended, Bill Cartwright had announced that he will not be returning as an assistant head coach to the Phoenix Suns. In July 2012, Elston Turner had competed for the head coach spot for the Portland Trail Blazers. Ultimately, he was not hired, and he stayed as an assistant coach for at least the start of the season. On August 28, 2012, the Suns hired Lindsey Hunter as an initial assistant head coach for player development. On October 4, 2012, the Suns also added both Sean Rooks and Basketball Hall of Famer Ralph Sampson as assistants for player development as well. Phoenix Mercury head coach Corey Gaines has also gained an assistant head coach role for player development later on in the season as well. The same thing would also be said for Dan Panaggio later on in 2013 as well.

On January 18, 2013, head coach Alvin Gentry was fired from head coaching duties. Gentry's firing came right after the Suns' worst opening stint in 28 years. Two days later, the Suns announced that Lindsey Hunter would surprisingly take on the role of interim head coach for the Suns instead of either Dan Majerle or Elston Turner throughout the remainder of the season. It was also announced that Sean Rooks would resign from his developmental coaching duties. A day later, Suns fan favorite Dan Majerle announced that he would resign from his assistant head coaching duties. Two days later, defensive assistant head coach Elston Turner announced his resignation from his duties as well. Because of their resignations, Phoenix Mercury head coach Corey Gaines  gained a more permanent assistant coaching role for at least the rest of the season. In addition, former Suns scout and Shanghai Sharks head coach Dan Panaggio from the Chinese Basketball Association ended up becoming a new assistant head coach.

Roster

Salaries

Because the Suns decided to amnesty Josh Childress' contract, he still gets paid the $6,500,000 that he would have been owed had he played for the Suns this season. While he still gets paid money out of being amnestied from the team for two more seasons, his salary does not actually affect the Suns' actual salary cap. In addition, since Brad Miller's contract guaranteed him around $850,000 this season, he was paid that salary despite being waived by the team and retiring in the process. Also, because Luke Zeller was waived from the team after January 10, 2013, came to fruition, his rookie salary of $473,604 ended up being counted by the Suns' salary cap as well since his contract was guaranteed by that point of the season.

Pre-season

Game log

|- bgcolor=ffcccc
| 1
| October 10
| @ Sacramento
| 
| Wesley Johnson (18)
| Marcin Gortat,Markieff Morris,P. J. Tucker (7)
| Michael Beasley (5)
| Power Balance Pavilion
| 0–1
|- bgcolor=ccffcc
| 2
| October 12
| Portland
| 
| Markieff Morris (14)
| Marcin Gortat (8)
| Goran Dragić (9)
| US Airways Center
| 1–1
|- bgcolor=ccffcc
| 3
| October 17
| @ Dallas
| 
| Jared Dudley (16)
| Marcin Gortat,Markieff Morris (6)
| Goran Dragić (6)
| American Airlines Center
| 2–1
|- bgcolor=ffcccc
| 4
| October 19
| @ Oklahoma City
| 
| Wesley Johnson (15)
| Solomon Jones (10)
| Diante Garrett (5)
| BOK Center
| 2–2
|- bgcolor=ccffcc
| 5
| October 22
| Sacramento
| 
| Jared Dudley (25)
| Marcin Gortat (12)
| Goran Dragić (6)
| US Airways Center
| 3–2
|- bgcolor=ffcccc
| 6
| October 23
| @ Golden State
| 
| Marcin Gortat (19)
| Marcin Gortat (10)
| Goran Dragić (6)
| Oracle Arena
| 3–3
|- bgcolor=ccffcc
| 7
| October 26
| Denver
| 
| Michael Beasley (29)
| Michael Beasley (10)
| Goran Dragić (6)
| US Airways Center
| 4–3

Regular season

Standings

Game log

|- bgcolor="#ffcccc"
| 1
| October 31
| Golden State
| 
| Goran Dragić (17)
| Luis Scola (11)
| Goran Dragić (8)
| US Airways Center15,678
| 0–1

|- bgcolor="ccffcc"
| 2
| November 2
| Detroit
| 
| Michael Beasley, Marcin Gortat (16)
| Marcin Gortat (16)
| Goran Dragić (10)
| US Airways Center15,107
| 1–1
|- bgcolor="ffcccc"
| 3
| November 4
| @ Orlando
| 
| Luis Scola (24)
| Marcin Gortat (11)
| Goran Dragić (8)
| Amway Center17,022
| 1–2
|- bgcolor="ffcccc"
| 4
| November 5
| @ Miami
| 
| Shannon Brown (18)
| Marcin Gortat (13)
| Goran Dragić (9)
| American Airlines Arena19,600
| 1–3
|- bgcolor="ccffcc"
| 5
| November 7
| @ Charlotte
| 
| Shannon Brown (24)
| Michael Beasley (15)
| Goran Dragić (8) 
| Time Warner Cable Arena13,905
| 2–3
|- bgcolor="ccffcc"
| 6
| November 9
| Cleveland
| 
| Goran Dragić (26)
| Marcin Gortat (8)
| Michael Beasley (5)
| US Airways Center15,236
| 3–3
|- bgcolor="ffcccc"
| 7
| November 10
| @ Utah
| 
| Luis Scola (21)
| Luis Scola (11)
| Goran Dragić (6)
| EnergySolutions Arena19,100
| 3–4
|- bgcolor="ccffcc"
| 8
| November 12
| Denver
| 
| Goran Dragić (26)
| Marcin Gortat (11)
| Goran Dragić (7)
| US Airways Center14,060
| 4–4
|- bgcolor="ffcccc"
| 9
| November 14
| Chicago
| 
| Luis Scola (24)
| Luis Scola (14)
| Goran Dragić (5)
| US Airways Center15,305
| 4–5
|- bgcolor="ffcccc"
| 10
| November 16
| @ L.A. Lakers
| 
| Goran Dragić (22)
| Marcin Gortat, Luis Scola (8)
| Michael Beasley (9)
| Staples Center18,997
| 4–6
|- bgcolor="ffcccc"
| 11
| November 17
| Miami
| 
| Markieff Morris (16) 
| Michael Beasley (8)
| Goran Dragić (8)
| US Airways Center16,840
| 4–7
|- bgcolor="ccffcc"
| 12
| November 21
| Portland
| 
| Marcin Gortat (22)
| Marcin Gortat, Markieff Morris (7)
| Goran Dragić (8)
| US Airways Center14,263
| 5–7
|- bgcolor="ccffcc"
| 13
| November 23
| New Orleans
| 
| Markieff Morris (23)
| Jermaine O'Neal (11)
| Goran Dragić (8)
| US Airways Center14,020
| 6–7
|- bgcolor="ffcccc"
| 14
| November 25
| @ Philadelphia
| 
| Michael Beasley (21)
| Markieff Morris (10)
| Shannon Brown (7) 
| Wells Fargo Center14,518
| 6–8
|- bgcolor="ccffcc"
| 15
| November 27
| @ Cleveland
| 
| Goran Dragić (19) 
| Jermaine O'Neal (6)
| Goran Dragić (7) 
| Quicken Loans Arena13,687
| 7–8
|- bgcolor="ffcccc"
| 16
| November 28
| @ Detroit
| 
| Luis Scola (11) 
| Jermaine O'Neal (7)
| Wesley Johnson (3) 
| The Palace of Auburn Hills10,517
| 7–9
|- bgcolor="ffcccc"
| 17
| November 30
| @ Toronto
| 
| Shannon Brown, Jared Dudley, Marcin Gortat (14)
| Marcin Gortat (6)
| Michael Beasley (6)
| Air Canada Centre18,246
| 7–10

|- bgcolor="ffcccc"
| 18
| December 2
| @ New York
| 
| Marcin Gortat (18)
| Marcin Gortat (10)
| Goran Dragić (5)
| Madison Square Garden19,033
| 7–11
|- bgcolor="ffcccc"
| 19
| December 4
| @ Memphis
| 
| Goran Dragić (19)
| Luis Scola (8)
| Goran Dragić (7)
| FedExForum14,481
| 7–12
|- bgcolor="ffcccc"
| 20
| December 6
| Dallas
| 
| Goran Dragić, Markieff Morris (15)
| Markieff Morris (17)
| Goran Dragić (4)
| US Airways Center14,481
| 7–13
|- bgcolor="ffcccc"
| 21
| December 8
| @ L.A. Clippers
| 
| Michael Beasley (21)
| Luis Scola (10)
| Michael Beasley, Goran Dragić (5)
| Staples Center19,060
| 7–14
|- bgcolor="ffcccc"
| 22
| December 9
| Orlando
| 
| Shannon Brown (17)
| Marcin Gortat (6)
| Sebastian Telfair (8)
| US Airways Center13,565
| 7–15
|- bgcolor="ccffcc"
| 23
| December 12
| Memphis
| 
| Shannon Brown, Jared Dudley (15)
| Jared Dudley (9)
| Goran Dragić (8)
| US Airways Center13,093
| 8–15
|- bgcolor="ccffcc"
| 24
| December 14
| Utah
| 
| Jared Dudley (22)
| Marcin Gortat (14)
| Goran Dragić, Jared Dudley (5)
| US Airways Center14,182
| 9–15
|- bgcolor="ccffcc"
| 25
| December 17
| Sacramento
| 
| Shannon Brown (22)
| Marcin Gortat (13)
| Luis Scola (10)
| US Airways Center13,068
| 10–15
|- bgcolor="ccffcc"
| 26
| December 19
| Charlotte
| 
| Shannon Brown (26)
| Marcin Gortat (9)
| Goran Dragić (11)
| US Airways Center13,308
| 11–15
|- bgcolor="ffcccc"
| 27
| December 22
| @ Portland
| 
| Marcin Gortat (18)
| Marcin Gortat (9)
| Jared Dudley (10)
| Rose Garden19,746
| 11–16
|- bgcolor="ffcccc"
| 28
| December 23
| L.A. Clippers
| 
| Jared Dudley (19)
| Marcin Gortat (12)
| Shannon Brown (6)
| US Airways Center14,741
| 11–17
|- bgcolor="ffcccc"
| 29
| December 26
| New York
| 
| Jared Dudley (36)
| Marcin Gortat (9)
| Shannon Brown, Sebastian Telfair (4)
| US Airways Center15,153
| 11–18
|- bgcolor="#ffcccc"
| 30
| December 28
| @ Indiana
| 
| Sebastian Telfair (19)
| Marcin Gortat (10)
| Sebastian Telfair (6)
| Bankers Life Fieldhouse15,288
| 11–19
|- bgcolor="#ffcccc"
| 31
| December 29
| @ Minnesota
| 
| Luis Scola (33)
| Luis Scola (10)
| Goran Dragić (12)
| Target Center19,356
| 11–20
|- bgcolor="#ffcccc"
| 32
| December 31
| @ Oklahoma City
| 
| Luis Scola (24)
| Marcin Gortat (10)
| Goran Dragić (8)
| Chesapeake Energy Arena18,203
| 11–21

|- bgcolor="#ccffcc"
| 33
| January 2
| Philadelphia
| 
| Luis Scola (21)
| Marcin Gortat (14)
| Luis Scola (9)
| US Airways Center16,034
| 12–21
|- bgcolor="#ffcccc"
| 34
| January 4
| Utah
| 
| Marcin Gortat (18)
| Marcin Gortat (11)
| Goran Dragić (6)
| US Airways Center14,874
| 12–22
|- bgcolor="#ffcccc"
| 35
| January 6
| Memphis
| 
| P. J. Tucker (17)
| Marcin Gortat (8)
| Goran Dragić, Luis Scola (6)
| US Airways Center13,197
| 12–23
|- bgcolor="#ffcccc"
| 36
| January 8
| @ Milwaukee
| 
| Goran Dragić (21)
| Marcin Gortat (14)
| Jared Dudley (8)
| Bradley Center13,014
| 12–24
|- bgcolor="#ffcccc"
| 37
| January 9
| @ Boston
| 
| Luis Scola (16)
| Marcin Gortat (14)
| Jared Dudley (5)
| TD Garden18,624
| 12–25
|- bgcolor="#ffcccc"
| 38
| January 11
| @ Brooklyn
| 
| Jared Dudley (18)
| Marcin Gortat, P. J. Tucker (8)
| Shannon Brown, Jared Dudley (4)
| Barclays Center16,272
| 12–26
|- bgcolor="#ccffcc"
| 39
| January 12
| @ Chicago
| 
| Luis Scola (22)
| Marcin Gortat (10)
| Goran Dragić (8)
| United Center21,874
| 13–26
|- bgcolor="#ffcccc"
| 40
| January 14
| Oklahoma City
| 
| Shannon Brown (21)
| Marcin Gortat (15)
| Luis Scola (5)
| US Airways Center14,951
| 13–27
|- bgcolor="#ffcccc"
| 41
| January 17
| Milwaukee
| 
| Shannon Brown (20)
| Luis Scola (8)
| Goran Dragić, Jared Dudley (4)
| US Airways Center15,963
| 13–28
|- bgcolor="#ccffcc"
| 42
| January 23
| @ Sacramento
| 
| Luis Scola (21)
| Luis Scola (7)
| Goran Dragić (11)
| Power Balance Pavilion12,741
| 14–28
|- bgcolor="#ccffcc"
| 43
| January 24
| L.A. Clippers
| 
| Goran Dragić (24)
| Luis Scola (9)
| Goran Dragić (8)
| US Airways Center16,017
| 15–28
|- bgcolor="#ffcccc"
| 44
| January 26
| @ San Antonio
| 
| Jared Dudley (23)
| Marcin Gortat (12)
| Goran Dragić (10)
| AT&T Center18,581
| 15–29
|- bgcolor="#ffcccc"
| 45
| January 27
| @ Dallas
| 
| Goran Dragić (18)
| Marcin Gortat (8)
| Goran Dragić (8)
| American Airlines Center20,305
| 15–30
|- bgcolor="#ccffcc"
| 46
| January 30
| L.A. Lakers
| 
| Michael Beasley (27)
| Marcin Gortat (12)
| Goran Dragić (8)
| US Airways Center17,184
| 16–30

|- bgcolor="#ffcccc"
| 47
| February 1
| Dallas
| 
| Shannon Brown (20)
| Goran Dragić, Luis Scola, P. J. Tucker (8)
| Goran Dragić (9)
| US Airways Center16,304
| 16–31
|- bgcolor="#ffcccc"
| 48
| February 2
| @ Golden State
| 
| Michael Beasley (24)
| Luis Scola (14)
| Goran Dragić (7)
| Oracle Arena19,596
| 16–32
|- bgcolor="#ccffcc"
| 49
| February 5
| @ Memphis
| 
| Marcin Gortat (20)
| Marcin Gortat, Luis Scola, P. J. Tucker (7)
| Goran Dragić, Kendall Marshall (4)
| FedExForum14,933
| 17–32
|- bgcolor="#ffccccc"
| 50
| February 6
| @ New Orleans
| 
| Jared Dudley, Marcin Gortat (14)
| Marcin Gortat (7)
| Goran Dragić (6)
| New Orleans Arena12,148
| 17–33
|- bgcolor="#ffccccc"
| 51
| February 8
| @ Oklahoma City
| 
| Michael Beasley (25)
| Michael Beasley (7)
| Goran Dragić (6)
| Chesapeake Energy Arena18,203
| 17–34
|- bgcolor="#ffcccc"
| 52
| February 10
| Oklahoma City
| 
| Markieff Morris (12)
| Michael Beasley, Jermaine O'Neal (8)
| Goran Dragić (4)
| US Airways Center16,773
| 17–35
|- bgcolor="#ffcccc"
| 53
| February 12
| @ L.A. Lakers
| 
| Michael Beasley (18)
| Jermaine O'Neal (13)
| Goran Dragić (6)
| Staples Center18,997
| 17–36
|- align="center"
|colspan="9" bgcolor="#bbcaff"|All-Star Break
|- bgcolor="#ccffcc"
| 54
| February 19
| @ Portland
| 
| Luis Scola (18)
| Jermaine O'Neal (13)
| Goran Dragić (18)
| Rose Garden20,499
| 18–36
|- bgcolor="#ffcccc"
| 55
| February 20
| @ Golden State
| 
| Goran Dragić (20)
| Jermaine O'Neal (12)
| Goran Dragić (10)
| Oracle Arena19,596
| 18–37
|- bgcolor="#ffcccc"
| 56
| February 22
| Boston
| 
| Goran Dragić (19)
| Marcin Gortat (6)
| Goran Dragić (10)
| US Airways Center18,422 
| 18–38
|- bgcolor="#ffcccc"
| 57
| February 24
| San Antonio
|  
| Marcin Gortat (21)
| Marcin Gortat (12)
| Goran Dragić (11)
| US Airways Center14,923 
| 18–39
|- bgcolor="#ccffcc"
| 58
| February 26
| Minnesota
| 
| Wesley Johnson, Markieff Morris, Marcin Gortat, (14)
| Jermaine O'Neal (13)
| Goran Dragić (7)
| US Airways Center14,973
| 19–39
|- bgcolor="#ccffcc"
| 59
| February 27
| @ San Antonio
| 
| Jermaine O'Neal (22)
| Marcin Gortat (15)
| Goran Dragić (13)
| AT&T Center17,573
| 20–39

|- bgcolor="#ccffcc"
| 60
| March 1
| Atlanta
| 
| Goran Dragić (19)
| Luis Scola (8)
| Goran Dragić (6)
| US Airways Center15,269
| 21–39
|- bgcolor="#ffcccc"
| 61
| March 6
| Toronto
|  
| Marcus Morris (12)
| Luis Scola (8)
| Goran Dragić (6)
| US Airways Center13,173 
| 21–40
|- bgcolor="#ffcccc"
| 62
| March 8
| @ Sacramento
|  
| Michael Beasley (24)
| Luis Scola (9)
| Goran Dragić (16)
| Power Balance Pavilion13,501 
| 21–41
|- bgcolor="#ccffcc"
| 63
| March 9
| Houston
| 
| Jared Dudley (22)
| Hamed Haddadi (11)
| Jared Dudley (7)
| US Airways Center16,734
| 22–41
|- bgcolor="#ffcccc"
| 64
| March 11
| Denver
| 
| Wesley Johnson (18)
| Luis Scola (13)
| Goran Dragić (7)
| US Airways Center15,597 
| 22–42
|- bgcolor="#ffcccc"
| 65
| March 13
| @ Houston
|  
| Wesley Johnson (15)
| Markieff Morris, Michael Beasley, Goran Dragić (5)
| Kendall Marshall (6)
| Toyota Center18,132 
| 22–43
|- bgcolor="#ffcccc"
| 66
| March 15
| @ Atlanta
| 
| Goran Dragić (21)
| Markieff Morris (11)
| Goran Dragić (8)
| Philips Arena14,282 
| 22–44
|- bgcolor="#ffcccc"
| 67
| March 16
| @ Washington
|  
| Michael Beasley (21)
| Markieff Morris, P. J. Tucker  (9)
| Goran Dragić (11)
| Verizon Center16,882 
| 22–45
|- bgcolor="#ccffcc"
| 68
| March 18
| L.A. Lakers
| 
| Luis Scola, Wesley Johnson (14)
| Luis Scola, Wesley Johnson (9)
| Goran Dragić (10)
| US Airways Center17,102
| 23–45
|- bgcolor="#ffcccc"
| 69
| March 20
| Washington
| 
| Wesley Johnson (18)
| P. J. Tucker  (10)
| Goran Dragić (11)
| US Airways Center14,819 
| 23–46
|- bgcolor="#ffcccc"
| 70
| March 22
| Minnesota
|  
| Luis Scola (17)
| Luis Scola (12)
| Goran Dragić (10)
| US Airways Center16,155 
| 23–47
|- bgcolor="#ffcccc"
| 71
| March 24
| Brooklyn
| 
| Goran Dragić (31)
| Markieff Morris (15)
| Goran Dragić (12)
| US Airways Center
| 23–48
|- bgcolor="#ffcccc"
| 72
| March 27
| @ Utah
| 
| Wesley Johnson (22)
| Luis Scola (7)
| Kendall Marshall (13)
| EnergySolutions Arena16,949 
| 23–49
|- bgcolor="#ffcccc"
| 73
| March 28
| Sacramento
|  
| Luis Scola (25)
| Michael Beasley (8)
| Kendall Marshall (10)
| US Airways Center15,086 
| 23–50
|- bgcolor="#ffcccc"
| 74
| March 30
| Indiana
|  
| Goran Dragić (21)
| Michael Beasley (6)
| Goran Dragić (9)
| US Airways Center17,090 
| 23–51

|- bgcolor="#ffcccc"
| 75
| April 3
| @ L.A. Clippers
| 
| Wesley Johnson (20)
| Luis Scola (11)
| Goran Dragić (4)
| Staples Center19,137 
| 23-52
|- bgcolor="#ffcccc"
| 76
| April 5
| Golden State
| 
| Goran Dragić (32)
| Jermaine O'Neal (9)
| P. J. Tucker (6)
| US Airways Center18,422 
| 23-53
|- bgcolor="#ffcccc"
| 77
| April 7
| New Orleans
|  
| Markieff Morris (18)
| Luis Scola (10)
| Goran Dragić (8)
| US Airways Center16,780
| 23-54
|- bgcolor="#ffcccc"
| 78
| April 9
| @ Houston
|   
| Luis Scola (28)
| Markieff Morris (9)
| Goran Dragić (8)
| Toyota Center16,673 
| 23-55
|- bgcolor="#ccffcc"
| 79
| April 10
| @ Dallas
|  
| Goran Dragić (21) 
| Luis Scola (15)
| Goran Dragić (13)
| American Airlines Center19,725 
| 24-55
|- bgcolor="#ffcccc"
| 80
| April 13
| @ Minnesota
|  
| Markieff Morris (20)
| Markieff Morris (9)
| Goran Dragić (14)
| Target Center16,701 
| 24-56
|- bgcolor="#ccffcc"
| 81
| April 15
| Houston
| 
| Luis Scola (26)
| Luis Scola (15)
| Goran Dragić (14)
| US Airways Center17,135
| 25-56
|- bgcolor="#ffcccc"
| 82
| April 17
| @ Denver
| 
| Luis Scola (17)
| Luis Scola (11)
| Kendall Marshall (14)
| Pepsi Center17,539
| 25-57

Player statistics

Season

|- align="center" bgcolor=""
|  || 75 || 20 || 20.7 || .405 || .313 || .746 || 3.8 || 1.5 || 0.4 || 0.5 || 10.1
|- align="center" bgcolor="#f0f0f0"
|  || 59 || 22 || 23.8 || .420 || .277 || .784 || 2.5 || 1.8 || 1.0 || 0.3 || 10.5
|- align="center" bgcolor=""
|  || 77 || style="background:#FF8800;color:#423189;" | 77 || style="background:#FF8800;color:#423189;" | 33.5 || .443 || .319 || .748 || 3.1 || style="background:#FF8800;color:#423189;" | 7.4 || style="background:#FF8800;color:#423189;" | 1.6 || 0.3 || style="background:#FF8800;color:#423189;" | 14.7
|- align="center" bgcolor="#f0f0f0"
|  || 79 || 50 || 27.5 || .468 || style="background:#FF8800;color:#423189;" | .391 || .796 || 3.1 || 2.6 || 0.9 || 0.1 || 10.9
|- align="center" bgcolor=""
|  || 19 || 0 || 7.9 || .327 || .200 || .500 || 0.8 || 1.6 || 0.5 || 0.0 || 2.1
|- align="center" bgcolor="#f0f0f0"
|  || 61 || 61 || 30.8 || style="background:#FF8800;color:#423189;" | .521 || .000 || .652 || style="background:#FF8800;color:#423189;" | 8.5 || 1.2 || 0.7 || style="background:#FF8800;color:#423189;" | 1.6 || 11.1
|- align="center" bgcolor=""
| * || 17 || 0 || 13.8 || .459 || . || .520 || 5.1 || 0.5 || 0.3 || 1.2 || 4.1
|- align="center" bgcolor="#f0f0f0"
|  || 50 || 21 || 19.0 || .407 || .323 || .771 || 2.5 || 0.7 || 0.4 || 0.4 || 8.0
|- align="center" bgcolor=""
|  || 48 || 3 || 14.6 || .371 || .315 || .571 || 0.9 || 3.0 || 0.5 || 0.1 || 3.0
|- align="center" bgcolor="#f0f0f0"
| * || 23 || 6 || 16.0 || .405 || .308 || .405 || 2.5 || 0.7 || 0.8 || 0.2 || 5.7
|- align="center" bgcolor=""
|  || style="background:#FF8800;color:#423189;" | 82 || 32 || 22.4 || .407 || .336 || .732 || 4.8 || 1.3 || 0.9 || 0.8 || 8.2
|- align="center" bgcolor="#f0f0f0"
|  || 55 || 4 || 18.7 || .482 || . || style="background:#FF8800;color:#423189;" | .835 || 5.3 || 0.8 || 0.3 || 1.4 || 8.3
|- align="center" bgcolor=""
|  || style="background:#FF8800;color:#423189;" | 82 || 67 || 26.6 || .473 || .188 || .787 || 6.6 || 2.2 || 0.8 || 0.4 || 12.8
|- align="center" bgcolor="#f0f0f0"
| * || 46 || 2 || 17.3 || .381 || .381 || .772 || 1.5 || 2.5 || 0.6 || 0.2 || 6.0
|- align="center" bgcolor=""
|  || 79 || 45 || 24.2 || .473 || .314 || .744 || 4.4 || 1.4 || 0.8 || 0.2 || 6.4
|- align="center" bgcolor="#f0f0f0"
|  || 16 || 0 || 3.6 || .346 || .200 || . || 0.6 || 0.2 || 0.0 || 0.0 || 1.2
|}
* – Stats with the Suns.

Awards and records

Awards

Week/month

All-Star

Records

Team records

Milestones
During this season, Jermaine O'Neal would surpass Hall of Famer centers Moses Malone, Artis Gilmore, and Elvin Hayes on the list of National Basketball Association career blocks leaders, recording 72 blocks throughout the season.

Team milestones
On January 12, 2013, the Phoenix Suns became the fourth fastest NBA team (tenth team overall) to win 2,000 games with a 97–81 road victory against the Chicago Bulls. The other three fastest 2,000 win teams were the Minneapolis/Los Angeles Lakers, the Boston Celtics, and the Syracuse Nationals/Philadelphia 76ers.

Injuries/personal missed games
September 20, 2012: Channing Frye was confirmed to miss the entirety of this season due to an enlargened heart via dilated cardiomyopathy. He would return to playing for the Suns the following season.
November 5, 2012: Jermaine O'Neal would miss six games due to the death of his aunt. He would return to play against the L.A. Lakers on November 16.
November 29, 2012: Kendall Marshall was assigned to the Suns' NBA D-League team: the Bakersfield Jam for nine games. He returned to the roster on December 22, 2012, against the Portland Trail Blazers.
January 10, 2013: Diante Garrett was assigned to the Suns' NBA D-League team: the Bakersfield Jam for seven games. He returned to the roster on January 28, 2013.
January 23, 2013: Jermaine O'Neal was confirmed to miss seven games due to having an irregular heartbeat. He ended up returning on February 5, 2013, against the Memphis Grizzlies.
March 5, 2013: Jermaine O'Neal would miss four games due to his daughter Asjia having surgery to repair a leaky heart valve. He ended up returning on March 13, 2013, against the Houston Rockets.
March 6, 2013: Marcin Gortat would be out for the Suns for the rest of the season by having a Lisfranc sprain occur in his right foot during a home game against the Toronto Raptors.
April 6, 2013: Diante Garrett was once again assigned to the Bakersfield Jam. He returned to the Suns a day later.
April 11, 2013: Diante Garrett was once more assigned to the Bakersfield Jam.

Transactions

Trades

Free agents

Additions

Subtractions

See also
2012–13 NBA season

References

Phoenix Suns seasons
Phoenix